Elizabeth Ann Bennett (born July 25, 1978) is an American actress.

She was born in Westminster, Maryland.

Filmography

Film

Television

External links
 

1978 births
Living people
American television actresses
21st-century American actresses
People from Westminster, Maryland
Actresses from Maryland